Chumanuwri is a Gaunpalika (rural municipality) in Gorkha District in Gandaki Province of Nepal. It is divided into 7 wards.

On 10 March 2017, the government of Nepal implemented a new local level administrative structure merging the former VDCs. Chumanuwri is one of these 753 local units.

Demographics
At the time of the 2011 Nepal census, Chumanuwri Rural Municipality had a population of 7,417. Of these, 54.7% spoke Tamang, 33.7% Gurung, 6.7% Yolmo, 3.5% Nepali, 0.3% Sign language and 0.8% other languages as their first language.

In terms of ethnicity/caste, 55.4% were Tamang, 39.5% Gurung, 1.7% Hill Brahmin, 1.3% Ghale, 0.7% Kami, 0.6% Chhetri, 0.3% Thakuri and 0.6% others.

In terms of religion, 93.2% were Buddhist, 4.0% Hindu, 2.4% Christian and 0.3% others.

In terms of literacy, 33.6% could both read and write, 4.1% could read but not write and 62.2% could neither read nor write.

References 

Gorkha District
Gandaki Province
Rural municipalities of Nepal established in 2017
Rural municipalities in Gorkha District